Lemesurier Island is the second-largest island in the Icy Strait between Chichagof Island and the mainland of the Alaska Panhandle in the U.S. state of Alaska. The island lies about midway between the mainland city of Gustavus and the northwest Chichagof Island community of Elfin Cove.

The island was called Tàaś Daa by the Huna Tlingit people, which can be translated as "Two-headed Tide Island". The island was used as a place to gather currants, harvest seals and as a fort location.

The island was named by W.H. Dall, after William Le Mesurier (1767–1833), a midshipman on HMS Chatham.

It has a land area of 27.534 km2 ( 10.631 sq mi) and reported a population of one person in the 2000 census. Together with Pleasant Island and the Inian Islands, it forms the Pleasant/Lemesurier/Inian Islands Wilderness,  a wilderness area within Tongass National Forest that has been officially designated by the National Wilderness Preservation System.

See also
 List of U.S. Wilderness Areas

References

Lemesurier Island: Block 1022, Census Tract 3, Skagway-Hoonah-Angoon Census Area, Alaska United States Census Bureau

Islands of the Alexander Archipelago
Islands of Hoonah–Angoon Census Area, Alaska
Islands of Alaska
Islands of Unorganized Borough, Alaska